Libertella is a genus of fungi belonging to the family Diatrypaceae.

The genus was first described by John Baptiste Henri Joseph Desmazières in 1830, and the genus name of Libertella is in honour of Marie-Anne Libert (1782-1865), who was a Belgian botanist and mycologist. She was one of the first women plant pathologists.

The genus has cosmopolitan distribution.
Species:
 Libertella nigrificans
 Libertiella curvispora

References

Xylariales
Taxa named by John Baptiste Henri Joseph Desmazières
Taxa described in 1830